Minihi (also Minihy, Minic'hi) is a Breton term meaning a sacred space. Its etymology is Latin, being derived from the term , meaning "monastic territory".

Toponymy 
Minihi comes from Greek via the Latin word , monk.

References

Breton words and phrases
Catholic monastic orders